Cynthia Ellinor Beatrix Spencer, Countess Spencer  (née Hamilton; 16 August 1897 – 4 December 1972) was a British peeress and the paternal grandmother of Diana, Princess of Wales.

Life and family
Cynthia Hamilton was the daughter of James Hamilton, Marquess of Hamilton, later 3rd Duke of Abercorn (30 November 1869 – 12 September 1953) and Lady Rosalind Cecilia Caroline Bingham (26 February 1869 – 18 January 1958). Her maternal grandparents were Charles Bingham, 4th Earl of Lucan, and Lady Cecilia Catherine Gordon-Lennox, a daughter of Charles Gordon-Lennox, 5th Duke of Richmond, and Lady Caroline Paget.

Hamilton married Viscount Althorp on 26 February 1919 at St James's Church, Piccadilly, London.

They had two children:
 Lady Anne Spencer (4 August 1920 – 24 February 2020).  In February 1944 she, an officer in the Women's Royal Naval Service, married Christopher Baldwin Hughes Wake-Walker, a Captain in the Royal Navy, at Westminster Abbey. 
 Edward John Spencer, 8th Earl Spencer (24 January 1924 – 29 March 1992).

Countess Spencer was appointed a Lady of the Bedchamber to Queen Elizabeth in 1937. She continued in the role after Elizabeth became Queen Mother in 1952, and remained in post until her death.

She was the grandmother of Diana, Princess of Wales. Lady Spencer died at the Spencers' ancestral home, Althorp, of a brain tumour on 4 December 1972, aged 75. The Cynthia Spencer Hospice in Northampton is named in her memory.

Countess Spencer was little known outside court and local circles until, twenty years after her death, Andrew Morton wrote that the Princess of Wales "believes that her grandmother looks after her in the spirit world."

Honours
  4 June 1943: Officer of the Most Excellent Order of the British Empire (OBE)
  1 June 1953: Dame Commander of the Royal Victorian Order (DCVO)

Ancestry

Notes and sources

References
 G. E. Cokayne; with Vicary Gibbs, H. A. Doubleday, Geoffrey H. White, Duncan Warrand and Lord Howard de Walden, editors, The Complete Peerage of England, Scotland, Ireland, Great Britain and the United Kingdom, Extant, Extinct or Dormant, new ed., 13 volumes in 14 (1910–1959; reprint in 6 volumes, Gloucester: Alan Sutton Publishing, 2000), vol. XIII, p. 39.  
 Charles Mosley, Burke's Peerage and Baronetage, 106th edition, (Crans, Switzerland: Burke's Peerage (Genealogical Books) Ltd., 1999), vol. I p. 6 and vol. 2 p. 2673
 C. F. J. Hankinson, editor, Debretts Peerage, Baronetage, Knightage and Companionage, 147th year (London: Odhams Press, 1949), p. 1007.

External links
Peerage

1897 births
1972 deaths
Deaths from brain cancer in England
British countesses
Dames Commander of the Royal Victorian Order
Daughters of British dukes
Officers of the Order of the British Empire
Cynthia Spencer, Countess Spencer
Ladies of the Bedchamber